Rosiska Darcy de Oliveira is a Brazilian journalist and feminist writer.

Biography
She was born in Rio de Janeiro in 1944, she graduated in Law from the Pontifical Catholic University of Rio de Janeiro. In the 1960s, she began her professional career as a journalist at Revista Senhor, Jornal do Brasil, Revista Visão and O Globo.

In 1970, her journalistic career was interrupted by exile. Accused by the military dictatorship of denouncing the systematic practice of torture against political opponents, she was forced to take refuge in Geneva, Switzerland. With no native language, exile challenged her to build a new professional identity. A meeting in Geneva with Paulo Freire redirected her work to the field of education, an interest that was deepened in learning from Jean Piaget at the Faculté de Psychologie et Sciences de l'Education, University of Geneva. In 1971, she founded the Cultural Action Institute with Freire and took part in the process of rebuilding the educational system in Portuguese-speaking African countries recently freed from the colonial regime. The book Living and Learning: experiences in popular education (Brasiliense, 1980) came out of this period.  

In the 1970s, she actively participated in the emerging international women's movement. This experience inspired the essays Les Femmes en Mouvement et l'Avenir de l'Education (University of Geneva, 1978) and Educations et sociétés (UNESCO, 1979). The essay  Féminiser le Monde (Geneva, 1978) expresses the appreciation of female culture as a factor in enriching human relationships. She created a new course at the University of Geneva on the Feminine, a theme that supported her doctoral thesis at the Faculté de Psychologie et Sciences de l'Education: La Formation des Femmes com Miroir de l'Ambiguité. She taught for ten years at this university. 

Her first two books were written and published in French: Le Féminin Ambigu (Editions du Concept Moderne) and La Culture des Femmes: tradition et innovation (UNESCO).

With the reestablishment of democracy in 1980, she returned to Brazil and continued her writing activity on the issues of education and the feminine. She was a special advisor for four years to the vice-governor of Rio de Janeiro, Darcy Ribeiro, who, inspired by Anísio Teixeira, invested in the revaluation and quality of public education.

In defense of the female cause, she strove to promote the arrival of women in the places of knowledge and power as a requirement for the improvement of democracy. In 1991 she founded and chaired the Coalition of Brazilian Women. In 1995, she was appointed by the President of the Republic as president of the National Council for the Rights of Women, responsible for the implementation in Brazil of Equality Strategies, National Program for the Promotion of Gender Equality (Brasília, 1996).

In her action at the international level, she co-chaired the Brazilian Delegation to the World Conference on Women in Beijing, integrated the Women and Development Council of the Inter-American Development Bank and represented Brazil on the OAS Inter-American Commission of Women. She proposed the creation and was the first president of the Specialized Meeting of Women in Mercosur. She chaired the international network Terra Femina: a feminine look at global themes at the UN Conferences on Population, Human Rights, Environment and Social Development. A UNESCO consultant on The emergence of women in culture, she was a member of the World Panel on Education for Sustainable Development and the World Panel for Democracy, chaired by former UN Secretary General Boutros-Ghali.

As a contribution to the city in which she lives, she has chaired the Rio Como Vamos movement since 2007 to promote citizen participation and responsibility. She was Vice President of Culture at the Commercial Association of Rio de Janeiro and is a member of the Board of Directors of ACRJ, the Technical Council of the National Confederation of Industry and the Brazilian Institute for the Defense of the Disabled (IBDD).

A Professor at PUC-Rio, she deepened, over ten years, in courses, conferences and essays her research on literature written by women. Her vision of female culture as a civilizing factor inspired her essay Elogio da Diferença (Brasiliense, 1991), also published in the United States, In Praise of Difference (Rutgers, 1998), and reissued, with a new introduction, by Editora Rocco in 2012 .

Time Reengineering (Rocco, 2003), a second milestone in her essay writing, extended her field of analysis to the problems of using time in the contemporary world, focusing on its impact on the family.

The reunion with the Brazilian roots and the mother tongue fertilized her literary vocation, carried out in four books of chronicles and tales: The Lady and the Unicorn (Rocco, 2000), Autumn of Gold and Sangue (Rocco, 2002), The Nature of Scorpion (Rocco, 2006) and Ground Floor (Rocco, 2010). Two new books, Elogio da Liberdade: essays on ethics in times of transition and
Masquerade Ball, chronicles of the first decade of the 21st century (both in press), were published by Editora Rocco in 2013.

From 2007 to 2015, she chaired the Rio Como Vamos movement to promote citizen participation and responsibility. She was Vice President of Culture at the Commercial Association of Rio de Janeiro and was a member of the Board of Directors of ACRJ, of the Technical Council of the National Confederation of Industry and of the Brazilian Institute for the Defense of the Disabled (IBDD), of PEN Clube do Brasil, of the Council Scientific Museum of Tomorrow.

Awards and honours
Among her decorations and distinctions are the Order of Rio Branco, given by the President of the Republic, the Euclides da Cunha Medal of the Brazilian Academy of Letters, the Tiradentes Medal of the Legislative Assembly of the State of Rio de Janeiro, the Pride Carioca Award from the City Hall of Rio de Janeiro, and the Nísia Floresta Medal from the state of Rio Grande do Norte.

She is the sixth occupant of chair 10 of the Brazilian Academy of Letters, to which she was elected on April 11, 2013. She was received on June 14, 2013 by Academic Eduardo Portella, in succession to Academic Lêdo Ivo, who died on December 23, 2012.

References

1944 births
Living people
Brazilian writers
Brazilian women writers
Pontifical Catholic University of Rio de Janeiro alumni